Marco Zaragoza (born 25 April 1973) is a Mexican former cyclist. He competed at the 1992 Summer Olympics and the 1996 Summer Olympics.

References

External links
 

1973 births
Living people
Mexican male cyclists
Olympic cyclists of Mexico
Cyclists at the 1992 Summer Olympics
Cyclists at the 1996 Summer Olympics
Place of birth missing (living people)
Competitors at the 2002 Central American and Caribbean Games